The men's bantamweight (−63 kilograms) event at the 2010 Asian Games took place on 19 November 2010 at Guangdong Gymnasium, Guangzhou, China.

Schedule
All times are China Standard Time (UTC+08:00)

Results 
Legend
R — Won by referee stop contest

Final

Top half

Bottom half

References

Results

External links
Official website

Taekwondo at the 2010 Asian Games